The 2018–19 Princeton Tigers men's basketball team represented Princeton University during the 2018–19 NCAA Division I men's basketball season. The Tigers, led by eighth-year head coach Mitch Henderson, played their home games at Jadwin Gymnasium as members of the Ivy League.

Previous season
The Tigers finished the 2017–18 season with a record of 13–16 (5–9 in Ivy League play), which tied for fifth place with the Columbia Lions. They failed to qualify for the Ivy League tournament.

Offseason

Departures

Roster

Schedule and results
On December 29, Princeton defeated number 17-ranked Arizona State after Richmond Aririguzoh made a pair of free throws with 24.8 seconds left to provide the final 67–66 margin of victory. It was Princeton's first win over a ranked opponent since defeating the 25-ranked 2011–12 Harvard Crimson on February 11, 2012 and the school's first win over a top-20 opponent since head coach Henderson was a player on the 1995–96 Princeton team that upset the UCLA Bruins in the 1996 NCAA Division I men's basketball tournament.

|-
!colspan=8 style=| Regular season

|-
!colspan=12 style=| Ivy League tournament

References

Princeton Tigers men's basketball seasons
Princeton
Princeton Tigers men's basketball
Princeton Tigers men's basketball